Douthat State Park is a state park located in the Allegheny Mountains in Virginia. It is in Bath County and Alleghany County. The park is  total with a  lake, the second-largest Virginia state park after Pocahontas State Park. It is one of the original Virginia state parks built in the 1930s by the Civilian Conservation Corps.

History

The Douthat Land Company, a group of businessmen, donated the first portion of land — . In 1933, the Virginia General Assembly allotted $50,000 for the purchase of land for state parks, and the remainder of the present-day park was purchased with this money. The site of the park was originally almost completely covered by forests; all of the original cabins, campsites, trails, roads, and even the entirety of Douthat Lake were created by the CCC work crews. 

Approximately 600 men from the Civilian Conservation Corps developed and constructed the majority of the modern-day park system between 1933 and 1942.

Attractions

Mountain biking: Douthat State Park has become a premier mountain biking destination. Twenty-four of the twenty-six trails at Douthat are open to biking.  The park has been heralded as the best mountain biking destination on the East Coast.  By spring 2009, almost all of the 45 miles of 70-year-old Civilian Conservation Corps trail at Douthat will be restored to its original condition with sustainable trail design techniques integrated to maintain a unique mountain biking experience.
Fishing: Douthat allows trout fishing in its stocked lake with a valid Virginia Fishing License and a daily permit.
Boating: A boat ramp launch is available April through October. Jonboats (including those with electric motors), canoes, paddleboats, hydrocycle and funyaks (similar to kayaks) are available for rental. No gasoline-powered boats are allowed on the lake.
Hiking: Over  of varied difficulty trails are available, many of them created originally by the Civilian Conservation Corps. Horseback riding at the park is restricted to several trails on the Western side of the park and mountain biking is permitted on nearly all of the trails.
Swimming: The beach area of the lake is available from Memorial Day through Labor Day.
Restaurant/store: Douthat Lake View Restaurant was built by the Civilian Conservation Corps and overlooks the lake. Next to the restaurant are a camp store and a gift shop.
Picnicking: There are three picnic areas with shelters that can be reserved for a group.
Hunting: Hunting is allowed by reservation with the appropriate permits.

Awards and recognitions 
 1986 – Douthat recognized as a national historic district
 1998 – Virginia Lakes and Watersheds Association Award for Best Operated and Maintained Dam
 1999 – Centennial Medallion from the American Society of Landscape Architects
 1999 – Named one of Outside Family Vacation Guide's top ten state parks

See also

List of Virginia state parks
Great Depression
Franklin D. Roosevelt

References

External links

Main Information page for Douthat State Park
Douthat State Park in World Database on Protected Areas
Hunting at Virginia State Parks
Virginia State Parks park fees
Douthat State Park Environmental Education Group

Parks on the National Register of Historic Places in Virginia
Historic districts on the National Register of Historic Places in Virginia
State parks of Virginia
Appalachian Mountains
Parks in Bath County, Virginia
Parks in Alleghany County, Virginia
Civilian Conservation Corps in Virginia
Protected areas established in 1936
1936 establishments in Virginia
National Register of Historic Places in Alleghany County, Virginia
National Register of Historic Places in Bath County, Virginia
National Park Service rustic in Virginia